Philippa Lowthorpe (born 27 December 1961) is an English film and television director.  She was awarded the Deluxe Director Award at the WFTV Film and Television Awards for the miniseries Three Girls. She recently directed episodes of the second season of The Crown and the 2020 film Misbehaviour.

Early life
Lowthorpe was born in a village near Doncaster, then in the West Riding of Yorkshire, and grew up in Nettleham, Lincolnshire. She attended De Aston School in Market Rasen and then went to St Hilda's College, Oxford to study Classics. Lowthorpe moved to Bristol to make documentaries for BBC Bristol, including Three Salons at the Seaside and A Skirt Through History about women's untold stories.

Career
Lowthorpe started out as a director in documentaries.  Her award-winning documentaries led her to be invited to write and direct her first drama Eight Hours from Paris (1997) for George Faber, a  film for Screen Two in which real people played themselves, alongside professional actors.  This was followed by The Other Boleyn Girl (2003), adapted from the 2001 novel of the same name by Philippa Gregory, for BBC films, shown on BBC 2.

She was lead director on the very first series of Call the Midwife.  Her opening episode gained the highest audience for any debut of a drama in the past decade. She also directed the first Call the Midwife Christmas Special (2013), for which she won a BAFTA for directing.   She is the only woman ever to have won this award.

Other directing credits include the multi-award-winning Five Daughters (2010), Jamaica Inn (2014), Cider with Rosie (2015), and the feature film Swallows and Amazons (2016) for BFI/Studio Canal/BBC films.

Her credits include Jamaica Inn, Call the Midwife, for which she won a British Academy Television Craft Award in 2013, Five Daughters, Beau Brummell: This Charming Man (2006), and The Other Boleyn Girl (2003). A 2013 interview with her appears on the BAFTA website, and she received a British Film Institute award in 2013. Her very first feature film Swallows and Amazons won Grand Prize Feature at  New York International Children's Film Festival, and the Youth Jury Award  for Best Films4Families Feature at Seattle International Film Festival in 2017.

Lowthorpe's recent work, the BBC mini-series Three Girls (2017) about the Rochdale young child exploitation, reunited her with Executive Producer Susan Hogg and Producer Simon Lewis who she had previously worked with on the award-winning Five Daughters. The series  was awarded by BAFTA for best directing in fiction, with writer Nicole Taylor recognised for best writing in a drama series, and Úna Ní Dhonghaíle for best editing in fiction, in 2018.   In May 2018 "Three Girls" was also voted Best Mini Series at the BAFTA TV Awards (shared with Nicole Taylor, Susan Hogg and Simon Lewis).  In October 2018 "Three Girls"  also won the Prix Italia (again shared with Nicole Taylor, Susan Hogg and Simon Lewis).

Filmography

Film and television

Awards and nominations

Notes
1.  Call the Midwife — with Heidi Thomas (writer), Hugh Warren (producer), and Pippa Harris (executive producer) 
 ...  — with Heidi Thomas (writer) and Pippa Harris (executive producer)
2.  Three Girls — with Nicole Taylor (writer), Simon Lewis (producer), and Susan Hogg (executive producer)
3.  Swallows and Amazons — with Andrea Gibb
4.  Five Daughters — with Stephen Butchard and Simon Lewis

Honours
 Honorary Degree of Doctor of Arts in recognition of Lowthorpe's contribution to film and television, UWE Bristol.

References

External links

Philippa Lowthorpe — BFI

1961 births
British television directors
British film directors
People from Doncaster
People from Market Rasen
Living people
Alumni of St Hilda's College, Oxford
British women film directors
WFTV Award winners
British women television directors